Crank Yankers is an American adult puppet television show produced by Adam Carolla, Jimmy Kimmel and Daniel Kellison. It features actual crank calls made by show regulars and celebrity guests, while re-enacted onscreen by puppets for a visual aid that shows the viewer what is happening in the call. The show premiered on June 2, 2002, on Comedy Central. It returned to MTV2 on February 9, 2007, running again until March 30, 2007.

On February 11, 2019, Jimmy Kimmel announced on Jimmy Kimmel Live! that the show would be revived on Comedy Central for a fifth 20-episode season and mark the first project on Kimmel's new Kimmelot production imprint. The new season includes pranks on social media and other platforms. Kimmel's brother Jonathan Kimmel serves as the showrunner and executive producer. The fifth season premiered on September 25, 2019.

On March 5, 2020, Comedy Central announced Crank Yankers had been renewed for a 20-episode sixth season. The sixth season premiered on May 5, 2021.

Behind the scenes
The performers are given a basic outline of a premise by the writers, and call telephone numbers from a list of selected targets (known as "marks"). Using the basic premises, the performers improvise most of their lines, playing off of the responses of their marks, with the intention to keep them on the phone as long as possible.

With the exception of a few outside sources (including previous material from Jim Florentine and the Touch-Tone Terrorists), all the calls are made from Nevada. The Omnibus Crime Control and Safe Streets Act of 1968 makes it illegal in eleven  states to record telephone calls without both parties' consent. Under Nevada law, only one of the parties has to give consent (i.e., the caller), so prank calls can be recorded without the consent of the prank victims. One result of this was the series' schedule of creating and airing new episodes was fairly sporadic due to most of the celebrities living in Los Angeles, having Los Angeles-based jobs, and so were only periodically able to go to Las Vegas to make calls. Carolla, for example, took his radio program to Las Vegas once or twice a year, and while there would record new calls for the program.

The puppet designs were drawn by artist Todd James before being constructed based on the various marks' voices, and, along with a series of stock characters (such as "Niles Standish", "Bobby Fletcher" and "Special Ed") based on the performers' character voices, the calls are re-enacted for the skits.

The main character puppets for the first season were constructed by Bob Flanagan's company Den Design with additional puppets built by BJ Guyer, Carol Binion, Rick Lyon, Ron Binion, Jim Kroupa and Artie Esposito. An in-house puppet shop was set up for the following seasons to accommodate the fast-paced schedule of the show and the sheer volume of puppet characters required for each episode.

The puppets are puppeteered by Ron Binion, Rick Lyon, BJ Guyer, Victor Yerrid, Paul McGinnis, Alice Dinnean, Tyler Bunch, Drew Massey, Robin Walsh, Marc Petrosino, Artie Esposito, Julianne Buescher, Donna Kimball & Andy Hayward and other puppeteers.

Originally, the show was titled Prank Puppets; it was renamed after Comedy Central lawyers deemed that it implied malice.

Regular characters
 Karl Malone (voiced by Jimmy Kimmel): Kimmel's impression of then-NBA star Karl Malone. He regularly refers to himself in the third-person. "Don't hang up on Karl Malone."
 Gladys Murphy (voiced by Wanda Sykes): A boisterous black woman who makes embarrassing announcements, generally of a scatological or sexual nature. Her many children do things like gluing her buttocks to the toilet and stealing money from a malfunctioning bank machine.
 Niles Standish (voiced by Tony Barbieri): The British Earl of Yankerville, a rich and eccentric middle-aged pervert with homosexual tendencies. He frequently calls various services and asks for their price, then orders them to "double it" (Once even confusing someone by telling them to "cut it in half, and double it!"). He has an assistant named Cavendish.
 Giles Standish (voiced by Tony Barbieri): Niles' deformed twin brother.
 Special Ed (voiced by Jim Florentine): Bobby Fletcher's mentally challenged younger cousin who constantly repeats himself, makes random comments and shouts his catchphrase "Yay!" until the prank-victim gets frustrated. He makes a cameo in one of Bobby's prank calls, "Let Me Put My Brother on the Phone". In two prank calls of his own (one to a movie theater and one to a video store), Ed reveals that his favorite film is Air Bud. In the video-store call, he works in several references to The Shining. Ed is not present in the 2019 revival due to the character being deemed too offensive for modern audiences.
 Dick Birchum (voiced by Adam Carolla): A psychotic Vietnam War veteran whose hobbies include carpentry, Shotokan karate, spying on women in their beds or bathrooms by drilling holes or a hidden camera, and gun ownership. He has a 600-pound wife, a large 8-year-old son, and conjoined twin daughters. He lost part of his right leg in the war and 3 right-hand fingers in a carpentry accident. He frequently refers to his time in Vietnam and "smoking hash out of a human skull".
 Jimmy (voiced by Jimmy Kimmel): A Kimmel-based grown man who lives with his mother. He also has two young children who swear and play juvenile pranks.
 Bobby Fletcher (voiced by Jim Florentine): Ed's stoner underachieving older cousin. He is known to belch uncontrollably into the phone, which he uses to his advantage in order to annoy the victims of his prank calls.
 Elmer Higgins (voiced by Jimmy Kimmel): A crabby, elderly man (based on Kimmel's grandfather). He makes complaint calls and frequently goes off on unrelated, long-winded tangents about his younger days and various irrelevant subjects. He sometimes mentions his brother Charlie, as well as his gay grandson, Terrence Catheter.
 Helen Higgins (voiced by Susie Essman): Elmer's beautiful wife of over 60 years, she is an elderly woman who likes to proposition young men. Her son gave her a pet parrot who is well-versed in profanity. In a late-in-the-series sketch about Elmer wanting driving lessons, he mentions that she has died.
 Landalious "The Truth" Truefeld (voiced by David Alan Grier): A former football player who likes to rap.
 Spoonie Luv (voiced by Tracy Morgan): A smooth-talking African American hip hop-type character who makes lewd and suggestive comments. He often refers to himself as "Spoonie Luv from Up Above". In one particularly noteworthy prank call, he attempts to sell a video store tapes of himself masturbating.
 Hadassah Guberman (voiced by Sarah Silverman): A Jewish female college student who works various part-time jobs, including conducting surveys for O magazine. She frequently asks intrusive questions and makes veiled passive-aggressive insults. Her sexuality and sanity seem highly questionable.
 Terrence Catheter (voiced by Jimmy Kimmel): Elmer Higgins' grandson is an effeminate redhead who acts as spokesperson for various celebrities, such as Tom Cruise, Bill Cosby, Jared Fogle, J.K. Rowling, Mr. T and the Olsen twins. He calls various places of business to book appearances and asks them to comply with the celebrities' ridiculous demands.
 Tony Deloge (voiced by Bob Einstein): A loud-mouthed, fast-paced politician who calls random people to pander for votes as "district selectman". He occasionally tries to use his political power to get things for free.
 Cammie Smith (voiced by Lisa Arch): A nymphomaniac, she is a somewhat conceited, condescending 23-year-old exotic dancer.
 Boomer and the Nudge (voiced by Jimmy Kimmel and Patton Oswalt): Two obnoxious morning-radio disc jockeys who call people to make "on-air dares".
 Junkyard Willie (voiced by the Touch-Tone Terrorists): An obstructionist in the form of a gravelly-voiced black man who is actually an import from the Touch-Tone Terrorists where he is a regular character. He appears in two sketches as a supervisor at YPS ("Yankerville Package Service").
 Jim Bob the Handicapped Hillbilly (voiced by the Touch-Tone Terrorists): A mentally disabled hillbilly who works with Junkyard Willie at YPS.
 Sav Macauley (voiced by Dane Cook): The overly enthusiastic host of a phone game show, "The Phone Zone", where he calls people and asks ridiculous random trivia questions for cash prizes and interjects his own sound effects.
 OCD Ken (voiced by Kevin Nealon): An accountant with obsessive-compulsive disorder who prefers cleanliness and even numbers. He often requests people to press the pound key as part of his disorder.
 Danny (voiced by David Alan Grier): A man who repeatedly gets nervous or disgusted causing him to vomit over the phone. The vomit is depicted as an Exorcist-like liquid shooting out of the puppet's throat.
 Chip Douglas (voiced by Fred Armisen): A Mexican immigrant who is perpetually building a house with minimal supplies and poor command of the English language. He makes two prank calls to newspaper offices, one to attempt to sell cartoons and the other (a prank call in Spanish) to inform a Spanish-language newspaper that he has not received that day's edition.
 Katie (voiced by Katie Kimmel): Kimmel's then-12-year-old daughter made occasional appearances from 2003, initially with a few short lines but later making entire crank calls herself (notably pretending to be a drunken 9-year-old trying to order alcohol by phone).
 Kevin (voiced by Kevin Kimmel): Kimmel's then-10-year-old son made occasional appearances from 2003, including as Elmer Higgins' great-grandson.
 Foreign Guy (voiced by Dane Cook): A nameless immigrant who calls various places looking for assistance or to purchase something.
 Gene Winterbuck (voiced by Dane Cook): A paraplegic young man, who calls libraries requesting books with titles referring to disabilities in an offensive manner, such as "Johnny NoodleLegs".
 Lou Vilman (voiced by Kevin Nealon): An easily impressed guy who responds "Wow!" to everything.
 Dick Rogers (voiced by Seth MacFarlane): He will often call to complain about issues that would make someone from the 1940s uncomfortable, such as being hit on by men at a gay bar or getting a haircut from a female hairdresser. He also calls the YMCA for help with his alcohol problem.
 The Concierge (voiced by Tony Barbieri): A hotel concierge who calls guests informing them of issues with their room or the building and offering them little compensation, or otherwise inconveniencing their stay.

Spinoff
In 2011, there was a pilot for a traditionally-animated spinoff called The Birchums featuring Dick Birchum as the main character. He was redesigned to look younger and had a mustache. The pilot was made for FOX, but was not picked up as a series.

Notable performers 

The voices of the characters have been provided by:

Chief artists working for the show include:

Episodes

Season 1 (2002)

Season 2 (2003–04)

Season 3 (2004–05)

Season 4 (2007)

Season 5 (2019–20)

Season 6 (2021–22)

DVD releases

There are currently no plans for a DVD release for seasons 3 & 4, aka the MTV2 season of Crank Yankers.

CD releases
The Best Uncensored Crank Calls, Volume 1 (2002)
The Best Uncensored Crank Calls, Volume 2 (2002)
The Best Uncensored Crank Calls, Volume 3 (2003)

References

External links
 from Comedy Central

2002 American television series debuts
2007 American television series endings
2019 American television series debuts
2000s American sketch comedy television series
2010s American sketch comedy television series
2020s American sketch comedy television series
American television shows featuring puppetry
American television series revived after cancellation
Comedy Central original programming
MTV2 original programming
Prank calling
2000s American black comedy television series
2010s American black comedy television series
2020s American black comedy television series
Television series by ITV Studios